Ana Margarita Díaz Aceves (born February 6, 1972), better known as Ana Diaz, is a Mexican composer and singer of contemporary Mexican songs. In her musical style, she mixes sounds like jazz, blues, bossa nova, ballad, pop, Latin music, cumbia and Mexican rhythms, which essentially makes her genre world music.

Biography 
Ana Díaz was born in Oaxaca.  Her mother is from Guadalajara and her father from Sola de Vega. Her love for music and words comes from them. In her most recent work, Ana has approached the Chilean solteca, a genre native to the region, which she inherited from her father's family, particularly her grandmother. Interested from an early age, she began singing as an adolescent. Years later, she attended the Universidad Intercontinental in Mexico City, where she got a degree in communications.  Even though she did not study music formally, Ana dedicated herself to taking private singing lessons. Her first teacher was Nayeli Nesme, Mexican singer-songwriter, whose classes she paid for by singing in religious ceremonies on the weekends. She later moved back to Oaxaca and continued her self-taught musical studies.  It was there that she associated with other musicians to form different groups, the most significant ones being the duet formed with Oaxacan singer-songwriter Lorenzo Lopez and that formed with Mexican jazz musician Julio Garcia: Reloj de Arena. With Garcia, she began experimenting with musical genres new to her, such as jazz, funk and blues, also taking her to choral music, traditional music and children's music. In 2004, she took up her work as a soloist again and together with Cuban pianist Nilda Brizuela, she recorded one of her most significant works: Clouds of June. It has been fundamental to Ana to not focus her work on one single genre. She has opted for fusing diverse musical forms that she has come in contact with and using them in each of her CD's and compositions. She is a singer, composer, elementary school teacher and businesswoman.

Musical concept 
Aside from being a performer, Diaz writes part of the repertory she sings. She selects the rest of the material ranging from folkloric pieces from her native Oaxaca and Mexico to standards of jazz, bossa nova, trova, choral music, children's music, blues, Brazilian rhythms, African rhythms and Latin American folklore. She began by singing trova in 1993. Her concept is based on the fusion of diverse sounds and rhythms with palpable influences from Latin music, soft jazz, blues, pop and rock.

History 
Ana was a fellow of the FOESCA grant in 2003 and the PECDA grant in 2010. From the beginning, she has been self-taught. 
She writes some of the songs she performs with arrangements by musicians like Cuban pianist Nilda Brizuela, jazz musician Julio Garcia and the jazz pianist and guitarist Oscar Rafael Martínez from Oaxaca. Throughout her career, Ana has worked with such artists as Ernesto Anaya, Mexicanto, Tania Libertad, Lila Downs, Fernando Delgadillo, David Haro, Jose Hinojosa, Gerardo Peña, Carlos Porcel Nahuel, Victor Martinez, Geo Meneses, Hector Infanzon, Lorena y Los Alebrijes and Jaramar, among others, on various stages of Oaxaca and the rest of Mexico. Ana Diaz's music has been transmitted by different media such as television and the Oaxacan state radio. In 2004, she presented her album Life Begins via the Internet on the radio program La Hora México, transmitted by Radio Círculo de Madrid in Spain which was presented by Alejandro Aura. In March 2007, an interview with her was aired nationally as part of the program Voices Inside for Radio Educación. She was interviewed for The National Hour, which airs throughout Mexico, in March 2007, introducing the production of Clouds of June.

She devotes herself to promoting her work as a singer-songwriter and performer of contemporary popular music or fusion music giving concerts in various places inside and outside of Oaxaca.

She promotes and supports several cultural projects such as the children's compositions by Rene Cortes, with whom she created Guess What, Tangerine, in 1998, a proposal of children's songs, which in 2004 allowed them to produce The Little House of the Sun, a collection of three books and a CD premiered with the Symphony Orchestra of Oaxaca. In 2008, she participated in the album It's Time to Learn about Children's Rights, produced by the State DIF in Oaxaca.

In recent years, Diaz has collaborated with the Mexican singer Lila Downs to benefit the Guadalupe Musalem Scholarship Fund in Oaxaca City for poor, indigenous women to continue their studies.[3]
At the moment, Diaz is working as a composer, since she recently received the Maria Greever grant, given by well-recognized Mexican institutions such as Auditorio Nacional, the Alfredo Harp Helu Foundation and CONACULTA, among others. This same year she received the award for Best Interpretation at the Mexico, Song of my Heart nationwide contest with her song "Arrecifes de Coral".

Concert highlights 
Among her most important shows are:
	2006. Festival of Oaxacan Culture, Oaxaca, Oaxaca
	2006. Third Coyoacan Festival, Mexico City
	2007. Festival of Oaxacan Culture, Oaxaca, Oaxaca
	2007. October Festival in Guadalajara, Jalisco
	2007. Ocean Festival, Salina Cruz, Oaxaca
	2008. Forum for Oaxacan Creators, Oaxaca, Oaxaca
	2008. Autumn in Lagos, Lagos de Moreno, Jalisco
	2009. San Marcos Fair, Aguascalientes, Aguascalientes
	2009. Papirolas Festival, Guadalajara, Jalisco
	2009. Dominical Route Festival, Teposcolula, Oaxaca
	2009. Iztapalapa Christmas Festival, Mexico City
	2010. Ortiz Tirado Festival, FAOT, Sonora
	2010. Macedonio Alcala Theater Centennial, Oaxaca, Oaxaca
	2010. Humanitas Festival, Oaxaca, Oaxaca
	2011. May Festivals in Oaxaca 2011, Oaxaca, Oaxaca
	2011. Rodolfo Morales Cultural Week, Oaxaca, Oaxaca
	2011. Opening of the Pan-American Races, Huatulco, Oaxaca
	2011. Opening for Armando Manzanero concert, Oaxaca, Oaxaca
	2011. Singing roll in CATRINA, directed by Oaxacan dancer/choreographer Noel Suástegui, with eighty artists on stage

Social causes 
	2002. Listen to the S.O.S., Concert for COESIDA, Oaxaca, Oaxaca
	2004. First concert in benefit of Estancia Fraternidad, Oaxaca, Oaxaca
	2005. Second concert in benefit of Estancia Fraternidad, Oaxaca, Oaxaca
	2007. Concert in benefit of the Rosario Castellanos Women's Space, Oaxaca, Oaxaca
	2007. Concert participation in benefit of the Guadalupe Musalem Scholarship Fund along with Lila Downs
	2009. Musical evening participation in benefit of the Guadalupe Musalem Scholarship Fund along with Lila Downs
	2011. Musical evening participation in benefit of the Guadalupe Musalem Scholarship Fund along with Lila Downs

Live collaborations 
	2003. Participation in Amina Lawal, a dance performed by the Contemporary Ballet of the City of Oaxaca, by choreographer Laura Vera
	2011. Participation in the Contemporary Ballet of the City of Oaxaca, by choreographer Laura Vera
	2011. San Luis International Fair, with the children's musical group Bandula, San Luis Potosí, Mexico
	Singing roll in CATRINA, directed by Oaxacan dancer/choreographer Noel Suástegui, with eighty artists on stage

Media presence 
	La Hora Nacional (national radio)
	Animal Nocturno on TV Azteca (national television)
	Radio Educación (national radio)
	IMER (national radio)
	CORTV Oaxaca (local television)
	La Hora México, Spain
	Interview for Spain on musicnightinternational.com
	Various radio programs on the Internet
	Special program for Radio IRA 13, Bahía Blanca, Argentina
	El Imparcial (local press)
	Noticias (local press)
	Mujeres (local magazine)

Discography

Studio albums 
	2002: Recuerdos (Memories), independently produced
	2003: La vida que comienza (Life Begins), independently produced
	2004: Nubes de junio (Clouds of June), independently produced
	2008: Esta noche (Tonight), independently produced

Compilation albums 
	2007: Lo mejor de Ana Díaz (The Best of Ana Diaz), independently produced
	2009: Armonía en el Zócalo (Harmony in City Square), produced by the Secretary of Culture and the Arts, Oaxaca State Government

Collaborations 
	2000: La Luna (The Moon), CD by Italian singer-songwriter Daniel Semprini, independently produced
	2003: La Casita del Sol (The Little House of the Sun), songs by Rene Cortes, produced by Editorial Porrua
	2007: Es tiempo de aprender los derechos de los niños (It's Time to Learn about Children's Rights), produced by the DIF Oaxaca
	2010: Canta, Oaxaca, y llora (Sing, Oaxaca, and Cry), produced by the Rotary Club of Oaxaca
	2011: Chulita de mi alma (Precious Soul-Child), independently produced
	2013: "La La La" ("FEEL" album) by Japanese pop-singer Namie Amuro (lyrics & music)

References

External links 

Living people
People from Oaxaca City
Singers from Oaxaca
1972 births
21st-century Mexican singers
21st-century Mexican women singers